The 2011 6 Hours of Estoril (6 Horas do Estoril) was the final round of the 2011 Le Mans Series season. It took place at the Autódromo do Estoril on September 25, 2011.

Qualifying

Qualifying result
Pole position winners in each class are marked in bold.

Race result
Class winners in bold.  Cars failing to complete 70% of winner's distance marked as Not Classified (NC).

References

Estoril
6 Hours of Estoril
6 Hours of Estoril